Pablo Moreno Taboada (born 3 May 2002) is a Spanish footballer who plays as a forward for Portuguese club Marítimo.

Club career

Juventus
On 27 July 2018, Moreno joined Italian club Juventus, after scoring more than 200 goals in 5 years for Barcelona youth teams. He made his Serie C debut for Juventus U23 on 18 November 2018 in a game against Pontedera as a 90th-minute substitute for Alessandro Di Pardo.

Moreno made his first bench appearance for Juventus' senior squad on 17 March 2019 in a Serie A game against Genoa.

Manchester City
On 30 June 2020, Manchester City agreed to sign Moreno on a four-year deal, and to swap him with Félix Correia. On 18 September, he joined Girona in Segunda División on loan.

Upon returning, Moreno made his Manchester City debut on 27 July 2021, featuring as a substitute in a 2–0 friendly win against Preston North End. On 31 August, he returned to Girona on a one-year loan deal.

Marítimo
On 29 July 2022, Moreno was joined Portuguese Primeira Liga team Marítimo on a permanent contract, with Manchester City retaining the option to re-sign him with a "buy-back clause" included in the deal. Moreno made his Marítimo debut on 6 August, coming on as a late substitute in an away defeat to Porto on the opening day of the season.

References

External links
 
 

2002 births
Living people
Footballers from Granada
Spanish footballers
Spain youth international footballers
Association football forwards
Serie C players
Juventus Next Gen players
Manchester City F.C. players
Segunda División players
Girona FC players
C.S. Marítimo players
Spanish expatriate footballers
Expatriate footballers in England
Expatriate footballers in Italy
Spanish expatriate sportspeople in England
Spanish expatriate sportspeople in Italy
Spanish expatriate sportspeople in Portugal